Three Forks Airport  is a public use airport in Gallatin County, Montana, United States. The airport is owned by Gallatin County and located one nautical mile (2 km) southeast of the central business district of Three Forks, Montana. It is also known as Pogreba Field, named for a World War II, Korean War and Vietnam War combat aviator from Three Forks. This airport is included in the National Plan of Integrated Airport Systems for 2011–2015, which categorized it as a general aviation facility.

Facilities and aircraft 
Three Forks Airport covers an area of 160 acres (65 ha) at an elevation of 4,089 feet (1,246 m) above mean sea level. It has one runway designated 2/20 with an asphalt surface measuring 5,100 by 60 feet (1,554 x 18 m).

For the 12-month period ending August 17, 2011, the airport had 11,530 aircraft operations, an average of 31 per day: 63% air taxi, 28% general aviation, and 9% military. At that time there were 31 aircraft based at this airport: 81% single-engine, 16% ultralight, and 3% helicopter.

See also 
 List of airports in Montana
 Airway Radio Station

References

External links 
 Headwaters Flying Service, the fixed-base operator (FBO)
 Aerial image as of June 1995 from USGS The National Map
 

Airports in Montana
Transportation in Gallatin County, Montana
Buildings and structures in Gallatin County, Montana
Three Forks, Montana